Sipho Mngomezulu (born 10 October 1982) is a South African football (soccer) defender for Premier Soccer League club Bidvest Wits.

References

1982 births
South African soccer players
Living people
Association football defenders
Sportspeople from Soweto
Bidvest Wits F.C. players
Maritzburg United F.C. players
SuperSport United F.C. players
F.C. AK players